The list of Khitan inscriptions comprises a list of the corpus of known inscriptions written in the Khitan large script and the Khitan small script. These two scripts were used by the Khitan people in northern China during the 10th through 12th centuries for writing the extinct Khitan language. The Khitan language was in use during the Liao dynasty (916–1125), the Western Liao dynasty (1124–1218) and the Jin dynasty (1115–1234), but the last recorded Khitan speaker, Yelü Chucai, died in 1243, and the language probably became extinct soon afterwards.

There are no surviving examples of printed texts in the Khitan language, and aside from five example Khitan large characters with Chinese glosses in a book on calligraphy, Shūshǐ Huìyào (書史會要), written by Tao Zongyi (陶宗儀) in the mid 14th century, there are no Chinese glossaries or dictionaries of Khitan. The Khitan language is therefore little understood, and the two Khitan writing systems are only partially deciphered.

The main source of Khitan texts are monumental inscriptions, mostly comprising memorial tablets buried in the tombs of Khitan nobility. Only one monument in a Khitan script was known before the 20th century, the Record of the Younger Brother of the Emperor of the Great Jin Dynasty (Langjun xingji 郎君行記), which has stood in front of the tomb of Wu Zetian since at least 1618. Until the 1920s it was believed to be written in the Jurchen script. Only after the discovery of the memorial tablets of the Emperor Xingzong of Liao and his consort was it realized that the Record of the Younger Brother of the Emperor and the Liao-dynasty memorial tablets were both written in a Khitan script. Several more memorial tablets in the same script were discovered during the 1930s, including memorials for the Emperor Daozong of Liao and his consort. Initially it was not clear whether the script inscribed on these memorial tablets was the Khitan large script, recorded to have been devised in 920, or the Khitan small script, recorded to have been devised about 925. A different, unknown script, which appeared more similar to Chinese (incorporating many characters borrowed directly from Chinese), had been discovered on a temple monument in 1935, as well as on a memorial to Xiao Xiaozhong in 1951; and in 1962 Jin Guangping suggested that these two monuments were written using the Khitan large script, and that the Record of the Younger Brother of the Emperor and the imperial memorial tablets were written using the Khitan small script. This identification of the two Khitan scripts is now widely accepted.

There are about 15 known monuments with inscriptions in the Khitan large script, ranging in date from 986 to 1176, and about 40 known monuments with inscriptions in the Khitan small script, ranging in date from 1053 to 1171. The two scripts are mutually exclusive (never occurring together on the same monument), but it is not known why the Khitan people used two different scripts, or what determined the choice of which script to use.

In addition to monumental inscriptions, short inscriptions in both Khitan scripts have also been found on tomb murals and rock paintings, and on various portable artefacts such as mirrors, amulets, paiza (tablets of authority given to officials and envoys), and special non-circulation coins.  A number of bronze official seals with the seal face inscribed in the Khitan large script are also known. The Khitan characters on these seals are engraved in a convoluted calligraphic style that imitates the Chinese "nine-fold" seal script style of calligraphy.

Monumental inscriptions in the Khitan large script

Other inscriptions in the Khitan large script

Khitan large script seals

Monumental inscriptions in the Khitan small script

Other inscriptions in the Khitan small script

Khitan small script seals

See also

 List of Jurchen inscriptions
 Nova N 176, an undeciphered manuscript codex written in the Khitan large script

Notes

Footnotes

References

External links

Khitan inscriptions
Khitan inscriptions